Gianluca Floris (12 June 1964 – 4 February 2022) was an Italian writer and bel canto singer.

He featured in several recordings for Naxos Records, including playing the role of Bardolfo in a recording of Falstaff made at the Teatro del Maggio Musicale Fiorentino, Florence in 2006. 

Floris died on 4 February 2022, at the age of 57.

Works
 I Maestri Cantori, Nuoro, Il Maestrale 2000
 Lato Destro, Cagliari, CUEC 2006.
 La preda, collana Colorado Noir, Milano, Mondadori 2006
 L'inferno peggiore, Milano, PIEMME 2009

References

External links
  Sito ufficiale
 
 

1964 births
2022 deaths
21st-century Italian writers
Italian male singers
Italian opera singers
People from Cagliari